Eisbären Bremerhaven is a professional basketball club from Bremerhaven, Germany, that competes in the ProA. The team was established as the professional section of the club BSG Bremerhaven and played in the first-tiered Basketball Bundesliga (BBL) between 2005 and 2019.

The club plays its home games in the Bremerhaven Stadthalle, which has a capacity for 6,000 people.

History
In 2004–05, Eisbären won the 2. Basketball Bundesliga, which earned them promotion to the BBL. Following the 2018–19 season, Eisbären were relegated to the ProA.

Season by season

Players

Current roster

Individual awards
BBL Best Offensive Player
Darius Adams: 2014

Notable players

 Adam Ariel
 Darius Adams
 Adam Chubb
 Louis Campbell
 DeAndre Liggins
 Marcus Slaughter
 Frank Elegar
 Sven Schultze
 Ivars Timermanis

References

External links
 

Basketball teams in Germany
Sport in Bremerhaven
Basketball teams established in 2001
Sport in Bremen (state)